The men's 4 × 400 metres relay event at the 2003 Summer Universiade was held in Daegu, South Korea with the final on 30 August.

Results

Heats

Final

References
Results
Heat 2 results

Athletics at the 2003 Summer Universiade
2003